Kurigram Government College, located at the centre of Kurigram District headquarters, is the only honors college in the district. It is also one of the famous colleges of northern Bangladesh. It offers HSC, three-year Bachelor and four-year Honors courses. The college is affiliated to the National University. Several thousand students study here. The college has two academic buildings and two hostels, one for male and the other for female students.

History

Kurigram College was established in 1961 by some local elite and educated people with the help of the then Mahkuma (District) commissioner, Salim Uddin Ahmed. Ex-minister and deputy speaker of the National Assembly, Mr. Riaz Uddin Ahmed Bhola Mia, Ahmad Ali Boksi, advocate Aman Ullah and other prominent persons were involved in the establishment process of the college.

The academic activities with the faculty of Arts and Commerce started in Kurigram High School and, after three or four months, it was shifted to its present location. Initially, Mr. Pranballav Kranjai managed the administration and high school teacher Khitindranath Roy worked as part-time lecturer. Prof. Kausar Ali, popularly known as K. Ali, joined the college as principal. On March 1, 1980 the college was nationalized and named Kurigram Government College. Eminent educationist Prof. Kazi Rafikul Haque was appointed principal immediately after nationalization.

Location

Kurigram Govt. College is in the heart of Kurigram district town. The college is easily accessible since the Kurigram-Chilmari (KC) Road runs by the college. It is surrounded by such important buildings as District Administrator's Office, District Judge Court, Bangladesh Rifles (BDR) Office, Kurigram Govt. Boys High School, Kurigram Govt. Girls High School, District Health Complex, District Auditorium and the Stadium. The Dharla River and the Dharla Bridge are only 1 km from the campus. All these important amenities attract the students to this institution.

Faculties and departments
The college has three faculties. Under these faculties, there are 14 departments:
 Department of English
  Department of Bangla
  Department of Economics
  Department of History 
  Department of Philosophy
  Department of Political Science
 Department of Islamic History and Culture
  Department of Botany
  Department of Zoology
  Department of Physics
  Department of Chemistry
  Department of Mathematics
 Department of Accounting
  Department of Management

Administration and teaching staff
This is one of the leading colleges in northern Bangladesh in terms of academic excellence and professional teaching. The college has about 50 competent teachers from BCS General Education Cadre. Prof. Sabiha Khatun is the principal of this college while Mirza Md. Nasir Hossain is the vice principal. The college has made a lot of progress ever since its nationalization. Creation of new departments, erection of the largest Shahid Minar, establishment of the hostel for female students, beautification of the college with tree plantation and botanical garden, are some of the monumental accomplishments. Nowadays, the teachers and students are showing the best performance in the region.

See also
 Kurigram Sadar Upazila

References

External links
 Official Webpage of Kurigram Government College
 Official Webpage of Khalilganj School & College
 Official Webpage of Kurigram District
 Kurigram Web Portal The first web Portal of Kurigram District

Universities and colleges in Kurigram District
1961 establishments in East Pakistan